Coulter Flats also known as The Coulter, is a historic apartment building in Indianapolis, Indiana.  It was built in 1907, and is a three-story, six bay by six bay, Tudor Revival / Jacobean Revival style brick building with terra cotta ornamentation on a raised basement.  It is of hollow tile and concrete framing.  It features porches and Flemish gables.

It was listed on the National Register of Historic Places in 1990.

References

Apartment buildings in Indiana
Residential buildings on the National Register of Historic Places in Indiana
Residential buildings completed in 1907
Tudor Revival architecture in Indiana
Residential buildings in Indianapolis
National Register of Historic Places in Indianapolis